Hero was built in South America around 1795. She first appeared in Lloyd's Register (LR) in 1807. Captain Barnabas Gardner acquired a letter of marque on 15 June 1807. He then sailed her as a whaler British in the British Southern Whale Fishery. A privateer captured her off Peru in January 1809.

Hero entered LR in 1807 with Gardner, master, T.Ayles & Co., owners, and trade London–South Seas. 

On 24 June 1807 Hero passed by Portsmouth, as did , Hitchman, master, and Pandora, Anderson, master, all three whalers bound for the River Plate. On 13 July the three vessels passed by Madeira, still bound for the Plate.

Hero and Pandour arrived at Montevideo on 2 September and sailed for their destinations on 11 September. Memphis never arrived.

The privateer Fleche captured Hero, of London, Gardner, master, in January 1809 off Tombaz, on the coast of Peru. Hero struck after an engagement of an hour and a half. Alternatively, the action may have taken place off Coquimbo.

Citations and references
Citations

References

Captured ships
Age of Sail merchant ships of England
Whaling ships
1790s ships